Johannes Greber (1874–1944) born in Wenigerath, Germany, was a Catholic priest 

He claimed he had never become a medium himself; his wife later became a medium and was involved in a variety of spiritualist activities.

In Germany, he was ordained in 1900 and served a church in the poor area of Hunsrueck. Many in the area suffered from tuberculosis, even ‘’organizing nurses to treat large numbers of tuberculosis’’. During WW1, he also helped thousands of children escape the war by fleeing into Holland.

In 1923, he attended a séance and his life was changed. He renounced his vows and left the Catholic church. He emigrated to the USA in 1929 and began a nondenominational church, with prayer and healing sessions in Teaneck, NJ. He later worked on a translation of the New Testament, publishing ‘’The New Testament, A New Translation and Explanation Based on the Oldest Manuscripts’’ (1935). He claimed using the oldest sources available including the Greek codex D. Where a meaning was not clear, according to his prologue, he received supernatural guidance as he translated, after much time in prayer, with his wife acting as a medium, and with visions of the actual words given to him on occasion. “In the rare instances in which a text pronounced correct by the divine spirits can be found in none of the manuscripts available today, I have the text as given by the spirits.”

Greber's belief in spirit communication with holy spirits of God, which he portrayed as a common occurrence throughout the Old and New Testament, clearly affected his translation. For example, 1 Corinthians 12:28 is translated as “...mediums who speak in various foreign languages’’.”

Publications

 Communication with the Spirit World of God, Its Laws and Purpose (1932)
 A Plan for the Solution of the Problem of the German Refugees (1939)
 New Testament, A New Translation Based on the Oldest Manuscripts (1935)

References

External links
Link to this site with old translation PDF of Johannes Greber book
Link to site selling this translation
Link to site adding to his views
https://web.archive.org/web/20110913185925/http://www.johannesgreber.org/

1874 births
1944 deaths
German spiritualists
Spiritual mediums
Translators of the Bible into English